is a 1967 Japanese science fiction kaiju film that was directed by Kazui Nihonmatsu and stars Eiji Okada and Toshiya Wazaki.

Guilala returned in a 2008 Shochiku sequel (of sorts) called Monster X Strikes Back: Attack the G8 Summit.

Plot
The spaceship AAB Gamma is dispatched from Japan to the planet Mars to investigate reports of UFOs seen near the Red Planet. When the spaceship arrives, it encounters one of the UFOs, which suddenly sprays the AAB Gamma with spores. A sample of the spores is returned to Earth, where one of them begins to develop.

The spore is accidentally exposed to acid, and grows grows into a giant, lizard-like creature that is named "Guilala".  It continues to feed on any kind of energy source, and grows bigger and more powerful.  The monster begins a reign of destruction through Tokyo. It spits fireballs, feeds on nuclear fuel, turns into a flaming orb to travel great distances by air in mere minutes, and destroys all aircraft and tanks in its path. Guilala is finally defeated by fighter jets laden with bombs, which coat it in a substance called "Guilalalium", a substance that prevents it from absorbing energy.  This causes Guilala to shrink down to its original spore form.  Stored in a glass container filled with Guilalalium, it is rendered permanently harmless. The government promptly launches it back into space, where it will orbit the sun in a nigh-inescapable heliocentric orbit for the foreseeable future.

Cast
 Toshiya Wazaki as Captain K. Sano
 Itoko Harada as Michiko Taki
 Shinichi Yanagisawa as H. Miyamoto
 Eiji Okada as Dr. Kato
 Peggy Neal as Lisa Schneider (Japanese voice actor: Reiko Mutō)
 Franz Gruber as Dr. Berman (Japanese voice actor: Tamio Ōki)
 Mike Daneen as Dr. Stein (Japanese voice actor: Teiji Ōmiya)
 Keisuke Sonoi as Dr. M. Shioda
 Torahiko Hamada as Mr. Kimura
 Hiroshi Fujioka as Moon base worker
 Yuichi Okada as Guilala

Release
The X From Outer Space was released in Japan on 25 March 1967. The film was never released theatrically in the United States, but instead was released directly to television in 1968 by American International Television.

The Criterion Collection released The X from Outer Space on DVD through their Eclipse label in a boxed set entitled When Horror Came to Shochiku (which also includes Goké, Body Snatcher from Hell, The Living Skeleton and Genocide). This DVD set offers both an English subtitled and a dubbed version of the film. This boxed set was released on November 20, 2012.

Reception
Film historian Chuck Stephens described the film as having "a well-deserved reputation as one of the silliest and, as a consequence, most beloved rubber-suit monster movies ever made". Sight & Sound described the film as a "harebrained kaiju epic" that was "Cheesy, rich in comic non sequiturs and scored with an unpredictable mishmash of 1960s pop and bossa nova. X fits comfortably into one's stoned best-bad-movie rental evening". Author and film critic Glenn Erickson characterized the film as "simply... terrible," describing the monster as "a preposterous concoction, [being] a 20-story chicken with a head shaped like a jet plane." Writing for Turner Classic Movies, critic Nathaniel Thompson wrote that the film "offers a substantial amount of entertainment value (and unintentional humor), thanks to its dual menaces of a gloppy space entity and a rampaging chicken monster," and included a "jaw-dropping and vaguely pornographic dispatching of the beast at the end."

See also
 Monster X Strikes Back: Attack the G8 Summit
 List of Japanese films of 1967
 List of science fiction films of the 1960s

References

Footnotes

Sources

External links
 
 
 

Kaiju films
1967 films
Shochiku films
Films about astronauts
Films set in Shizuoka Prefecture
Films set in Tokyo
1960s science fiction films
American International Pictures films
1960s Japanese films